Taray at Teroy is a 1988 Filipino romantic comedy film directed by Pablo Santiago and starring Maricel Soriano and Randy Santiago as the respective titular characters, alongside Barbara Perez, Nova Villa, Jimmy Fabregas, Beverly Salviejo, Esther Chavez, and Nadia Montenegro. Produced by Regal Films, the film was released on February 25, 1988.

Critic Luciano E. Soriano of the Manila Standard gave the film a negative review, criticizing it as "[s]hallow and hollow" and "strictly attuned for the fans of the two lead stars".

Plot
Estela "Taray" Caluglog is a stern and faultfinding provincial girl who travels to the city to prepare her papers to become a domestic helper in Singapore. Once a sunglasses-wearing boy named Teroy accidentally bumps Taray with his motorcycle, Taray angrily chases after him with her switchblade. As further hijinks ensue, the two get to know each other and eventually fall in love.

Cast
Maricel Soriano as Estela "Taray" Caluglog
Randy Santiago as Terry (nicknamed "Teroy")
Barbara Perez
Nova Villa as Cora
Jimmy Fabregas as Caloy
Beverly Salviejo as Tiburcia Imburnal
Esther Chavez
Nadia Montenegro as Marita
Chito Alcid
Via Nueva
Reena Kuan
Sheila Israel
Jeanne Prospero
Candy Cruz
Harvy Vizcarra
Feling Cudia
Joseph Sera
The Hawi Boys
Jong Cuenco
Dennis Padilla
Willie Katigbak
Emer Guingon
Ferdie Tan
Marvie Mendoza
Bobby Rosales
Arnel Apeja

Release
Taray at Teroy was released in theaters on February 25, 1988. The film was released four days after Regal Films executive Lily Monteverde organized a birthday concert for Maricel Soriano at the Araneta Coliseum, broadcast live through IBC; Soriano's co-star Randy Santiago served as one of the emcees at the concert.

Critical response
Luciano E. Soriano of the Manila Standard gave the film a negative review, criticizing it as "[s]hallow and hollow" for its timeworn romantic plot and the disconnect between the characters' personalities and the comedic situations they are in. He also criticized Soriano's "mataray" (stern and faultfinding) performance as more irritating than funny, as well as the superficial characterization of the Marita character whose sole purpose is to provide a love triangle to the story. However, he commended Fabregas' "irrepressible" performance as Caloy, the lovestruck uncle of Teroy, which "saves this role from disaster". Soriano concluded that "this film is strictly attuned for the fans of the two lead stars...."

References

External links

1987 films
1987 romantic comedy films
1987 comedy films
Filipino-language films
Films directed by Pablo Santiago
Philippine comedy films
Philippine romantic comedy films